Mantidactylus zolitschka is a species of frog in the family Mantellidae.

It is endemic to Madagascar.
Its natural habitats are subtropical or tropical moist lowland forests and rivers.
It is threatened by major habitat loss.

References

zolitschka
Amphibians described in 2004
Endemic frogs of Madagascar
Taxonomy articles created by Polbot